Iredell may refer to:
Places
 Iredell County, North Carolina
 Iredell, Texas
People
 James Iredell (1751–1799), American Supreme Court Justice
 James Iredell Jr. 1788–1853), Governor of North Carolina